is a Japanese comedic act where two people wear the same large coat (haori) and pretend to be one (hunchbacked) person.  One person is the "face" and the other is the "arms".  Humor arises from the arms never being coordinated with the face.

This type of skit is considered a staple of Japanese comedy, traditional and modern, and is commonly used as a part of comedy shows; both live stage performances and Owarai (television comedy).

Use in the media
 In manga I"s, Ichitaka and Iori are made to perform a nininbaori act.
 The basic concept of nininboari-type humour is seen in the comedy of many cultures. The English comedy show Whose Line Is It Anyway? has a similar act called "Helping Hands".

External links
 AnimEigo's liner notes on nininbaori

Japanese entertainment terms
Japanese comedy